Hando Runnel (born on 24 November 1938 Liutsalu, Järva County) is an Estonian poet.

1957–1962 he studied agronomy at Estonian Agricultural Academy.

1966–1971 he worked on editorial board of journal Looming.

From 1992 he has been chairman of the governing council of Ilmamaa Publishers.

He was chief editor of the series Eesti mõttelugu ('Estonia History of Thought').

References

1938 births
Living people
20th-century Estonian poets
21st-century Estonian poets
Estonian male poets
People from Järva Parish